The 1962 Villanova Wildcats football team represented the Villanova University as an independent during the 1962 NCAA University Division football season. The head coach was Alexander F. Bell, coaching his third season with the Wildcats. The team played their home games at Villanova Stadium in Villanova, Pennsylvania.

Schedule

References

Villanova
Villanova Wildcats football seasons
Villanova Wildcats football